Kostyantyn Chekhovych (3 January 1847 – 28 April 1915) was a Ukrainian Greek Catholic hierarch in present-day Ukraine and Poland. He was the Eparchial Bishop of the Ukrainian Catholic Eparchy of Przemyśl, Sambir and Sanok from 1896 to 1915.

Born in Devyatyr, Austrian Empire (present day – Lviv Oblast, Ukraine) in the family of Ukrainian Greek-Catholic priest Yosyf and his wife Antonina (née Paslavska) in 1847. He was ordained a priest on 5 January 1873 by Bishop Ivan Stupnytskyi as married priest, but in the same 1873 his wife Mariya (née Sinkevych) died. He worked as the Rector of the Greek-Catholic Theological Seminary in Przemyśl from 1888 to 1890.

He was appointed by the Holy See as an Eparchial Bishop of the Ukrainian Catholic Eparchy of Przemyśl, Sambir and Sanok on 17 November 1896. He was consecrated to the Episcopate on 21 February 1897. The principal consecrator was Metropolitan Sylvester Sembratovych with four another co-consecrators.

He died in Russian captivity during World War I in Przemyśl on 28 April 1915.

References 

1847 births
1915 deaths
People from Lviv Oblast
People from the Kingdom of Galicia and Lodomeria
19th-century Eastern Catholic bishops
20th-century Eastern Catholic bishops
Bishops of the Ukrainian Greek Catholic Church
Bishops in Austria–Hungary
Bishops of Przemyśl